Arthur Leipzig (October 25, 1918 – December 5, 2014) was an American photographer who specialized in street photography and was known for his photographs of New York City.

Career
Leipzig was born in Brooklyn. After sustaining a serious injury to his right hand while working at a glass wholesaler, Leipzig joined the Photo League where he studied photography, took part in  Sid Grossman's Documentary Workshop, taught Advanced Technique classes for three years, and exhibited his work. From 1942 until 1946 he was a staff photographer for PM. He also studied under Paul Strand before quitting the League to pursue a career as a freelance photojournalist.

In 1955 Leipzig's 1943 photograph King of the Hill, depicting two little boys challenging each other on a sand heap, was selected by Edward Steichen  for the world-touring exhibition The Family of Man at the Museum of Modern Art in New York, that was seen by 9 million visitors.

Leipzig was a professor of art and the director of photography at the CW Post Campus of Long Island University from 1968–1991. In an effort to build his department and enhance the quality of photographic techniques, Leipzig recruited two well known photojournalists, Louis Stettner and Ken Johnson (formerly a photo editor with Black Star) to his staff. He also recruited the now, highly regarded female photographer, Christine Osinski.

Leipzig contributed his work to many publications including Fortune, Look, Parade, and Natural History, while continuing to pursue his independent projects.

In 2004, he won the Lucie Award for Outstanding Achievement in Fine Art Photography.

Leipzig died in Sea Cliff, New York on December 5, 2014, aged 96.

Exhibitions

Selected solo exhibitions
 2005  Albin O. Kuhn Library Gallery, UMBC (Baltimore)
 2005–2006 "On Assignment", Columbus Museum of Art (Columbus, MS)
 2007 "On Assignment: A Retrospective", Photographic Gallery (New York)
 2008 "Arthur Leipzig: Next Stop New York",  Suermondt-Ludwig-Museum (Aachen).
 2009 "Arthur Leipzig: Next Stop New York",  Städtische Galerie Iserlohn (Iserlohn)

Selected group exhibitions
 2003 "Looking for Leisure", Staley + Wise Gallery (New York)
 2005 "Winter Selections", Gendell Gallery (San Francisco)
 2006 "Right of Passage: Youth Culture from the Mid-Century", Howard Greenberg Gallery (New York)
 2007 "New York, NY", Fifty One Fine Art Photography (Antwerp)
 2009 "Sexy and the City - New York Photographs", Yossi Milo Gallery (New York)
 2009 "Greenberg in Hamburg", Flo Peters Gallery (Hamburg)
 2010 "Family of Man", Howard Greenberg Gallery (New York)
 2011-2012 "The Radical Camera: New York's Photo League, 1936-1951", The Jewish Museum (New York)

Permanent collections
 Bibliothèque nationale de France (Paris), Photographic Resource Center, Boston University, 2007. Accessed 7 January 2011.
 Brooklyn Museum
 National Portrait Gallery (Washington, DC)

Photographic books
 Sarah’s Daughters: A Celebration of Jewish Women, published by Women’s American ORT, 1988
 Growing up in New York; Boston: David R. Godine, 1995
 On Assignment with Arthur Leipzig; Boston: Long Island University Press, 2005
 Arthur Leipzig: Next Stop New York; Munich / New York: Prestel, 2008

Awards

 2004 Lucie Award for Outstanding Achievement in Fine Art Photography

References

American photojournalists
Photographers from New York (state)
Photography academics
People from Brooklyn
Street photographers
Long Island University faculty
1918 births
2014 deaths
Journalists from New York City